2826 Ahti, provisional designation , is a carbonaceous asteroid from the outer region of the asteroid belt, about 37 kilometers in diameter. The asteroid was discovered on 18 October 1939, by Finnish astronomer Yrjö Väisälä at Turku Observatory, Southwest Finland. It was named after Ahti from Finnish mythology.

Orbit and classification 

Ahti orbits the Sun in the outer main-belt at a distance of 3.1–3.4 AU once every 5 years and 9 months (2,115 days). Its orbit has an eccentricity of 0.05 and an inclination of 15° with respect to the ecliptic.

Physical characteristics 

Ahti has been characterized as a dark C-type asteroid.

Rotation period 

A photmetric lightcurve analysis by French astronomer Pierre Antonini in 2006, gave a longer than average rotation period of 24 hours. The result, however, is considered to be only provisional.

Diameter and albedo 

According to the surveys carried out by the Infrared Astronomical Satellite IRAS, the Japanese Akari satellite, and NASA's Wide-field Infrared Survey Explorer with its subsequent NEOWISE mission, Ahti measures between 36.71 and 55.33 kilometers in diameter and its surface has a low albedo between 0.023 and 0.0628.

The Collaborative Asteroid Lightcurve Link agrees best with the results obtained by IRAS, and derives a diameter of 36.60 kilometers with an albedo of 0.0479 and an absolute magnitude of 11.1.

Naming 

This minor planet was named for the god of the sea and of fishing, Ahti (also known as Ahto), mentioned in the Kalevala, a 19th-century work of epic poetry from Karelian and Finnish oral folklore and mythology.

The asteroid 1454 Kalevala is named after the Finish national epic. Ahti is also a common masculine name in Finland. The official naming citation was published by the Minor Planet Center on 26 May 1983.

References

External links 
 Asteroid Lightcurve Database (LCDB), query form (info )
 Dictionary of Minor Planet Names, Google books
 Asteroids and comets rotation curves, CdR – Observatoire de Genève, Raoul Behrend
 Discovery Circumstances: Numbered Minor Planets (1)-(5000) – Minor Planet Center
 
 

002826
Discoveries by Yrjö Väisälä
Named minor planets
19391018